Vassilis Mouratos (alternate spellings: Vasileios, Vasilis) (born November 24, 1997) is a Greek professional basketball player for Promitheas Patras of the Greek Basket League and the EuroCup. He is a 1.93 m (6'4") tall and 100 kg (220 lb.) combo guard. His current agent is Konstantinos Oikonomopoulos.

Professional career
After playing with the basketball team of Agioi Anargyroi in the Greek minors, Mouratos began his professional career in 2014, with the Greek League club Olympiacos, after he signed a 5-year contract with the Greek club. He was loaned to the Greek 2nd Division club Psychiko, for the 2016–17 season. Mouratos was released out of his 5-year contract with Olympiacos on June 19, 2017.

He then signed a 2-year contract with the Greek club GSL Faros.

On July 6, 2018, Mouratos signed a three-year deal with Peristeri. On June 30, 2019, Peristeri and Mouratos mutually parted ways.

On August 6, 2019, Mouratos signed a two-year deal with Lavrio. During the very successful 2020-21 season, where the club reached the Greek Basket League finals for the first time, Mouratos averaged 11.5 points, 2.5 rebounds, 5 assists, and 1.1 steals, in 33 games. On July 19, 2021, he officially renewed his contract with Lavrio. In 24 league games as the team's captain, he averaged 11.3 points, 3 rebounds, 6.3 assists and 1 steal, playing around 27 minutes per contest.

On July 1, 2022, Mouratos officially signed with Promitheas Patras of the Greek Basket League and the EuroCup.

National team career

Greek junior national team
Mouratos has been a member of the Greek junior national teams. With the junior national teams of Greece, he played at the 2013 TBF Under-16 World Cup in Sakarya, Turkey, where he helped Greece win the gold medal. He also played at the 2013 FIBA Europe Under-16 Championship, where he helped Greece win a bronze medal.

He also played at the 2014 FIBA Europe Under-18 Championship, the 2014 FIBA Under-17 World Cup, the 2015 FIBA Under-19 World Cup, and the 2nd division 2016 FIBA Europe Under-20 Championship Division B, where he won a bronze medal. He also played at the 2017 FIBA Europe Under-20 Championship, where he won a gold medal.

Greek senior national team
Mouratos became a member of the senior men's Greek national basketball team in 2017. He played at the 2019 FIBA World Cup qualification.

Awards and accomplishments

Pro career
2× Greek League Champion: (2015), (2016)

Greek junior national team
2013 TBF Under-16 World Cup: 
2013 FIBA Europe Under-16 Championship: 
2015 FIBA Europe Under-18 Championship: 
2016 FIBA Europe Under-20 Championship Division B: 
2017 FIBA Europe Under-20 Championship:

References

External links
 Vassilis Mouratos at euroleague.net
 Vassilis Mouratos at draftexpress.com
 Vassilis Mouratos at baskethotel.com
 Vassilis Mouratos at esake.gr 
 Vassilis Mouratos at basket.gr 
 Vassilis Mouratos at eurobasket.com
 Vassilis Mouratos at fiba.com (archive)
 Vassilis Mouratos at fibaeurope.com

1997 births
Living people
Basketball players from Athens
Greek men's basketball players
Gymnastikos S. Larissas B.C. players
Lavrio B.C. players
Olympiacos B.C. players
Promitheas Patras B.C. players
Peristeri B.C. players
Point guards
Psychiko B.C. players
Shooting guards